Svend Helge Hansen (born 13 September 1930) is a Danish former rower. He competed in the men's coxed four event at the 1960 Summer Olympics.

References

External links
 

1930 births
Possibly living people
Danish male rowers
Olympic rowers of Denmark
Rowers at the 1960 Summer Olympics
People from Lolland